Slowhand is the fifth full-length studio album by Eric Clapton. Released on 25 November 1977 by RSO Records, and titled after Clapton's nickname, it is one of his most commercially and critically successful studio albums. Slowhand produced the two hit singles "Lay Down Sally" and "Wonderful Tonight", reached various international music charts and was honoured with numerous awards and recording certifications. In 2012, a deluxe edition was released to celebrate the album's 35th anniversary.

Recording
Clapton wanted to work with record producer Glyn Johns, because he thought Johns produced great work with famous groups like the Rolling Stones and Eagles and understood how to work with both British and American musicians. While in the studio with Johns, Clapton noted that the A-list producer was very disciplined and disliked jamming, because it would kill important recording time. Although Clapton and his band were intoxicated nearly all the time when recording, Johns liked Clapton's work and brought out the best in every musician, according to Clapton.

Title and artwork
The album was titled after Clapton's nickname, which was given to him by Giorgio Gomelsky. In his 2007 autobiography, Clapton recalled that the name "Slowhand" seemed to be hanging on to his real name, because it seemed to be well received by both his American friends and fans who think of the Wild West when hearing the nickname. The album's artwork was done by Clapton himself with the help of Pattie Boyd and Dave Stewart, credited as "El & Nell Ink". Besides choosing various photos for the inner side of the gramophone record packaging are two pictures, Clapton notes, which have deeper importance to him: one picture, in which he kisses Boyd and another photograph showing a demolished Ferrari 365 GT4 BB, which Clapton bought after seeing George Harrison turning up with the same model at his Hurtwood Edge Estate. The car, which had been involved with Clapton in a car accident after the British recording artist finished touring in Australia, nearly killed him.

Release and reception

Slowhand was released on 25 November 1977 by RSO Records. In a contemporary review for Rolling Stone, John Swenson found Clapton's playing more subtle than before but his songs sobering and interesting psychologically, especially "Next Time You See Her", as they showed him "in touch with the horrible moral power and long-suffering self-righteousness that is the essence of the blues". Robert Christgau was less enthusiastic, lamenting how most of the record's best guitar solos were played by George Terry and feeling Clapton had regressed as a singer, "sounding like he's blown his voice. Doing what, I wonder."

In a retrospective review for AllMusic, Stephen Thomas Erlewine wrote that the confident, virtuosic quality in the band's playing and the diversity of the songwriting made Slowhand "rank with 461 Ocean Boulevard as Eric Clapton's best albums". Yahoo! Music's Dave DiMartino said the record was full of hits and "tasteful" music. In 2003, Slowhand was ranked number 325 on Rolling Stones list of The 500 Greatest Albums of All Time, and again in 2012.

Censorship in Argentina
The rock song "Cocaine" was censored and removed from the Argentine edition of the album in late 1977. The military government of the time considered the song harmful to young people and inviting them to get high. The ban was lifted in 1984. Clapton later said that it is useless to intentionally write an anti-drug song like "Cocaine" and hope that people grasp the meaning. After several years, Clapton began including the phrase "that dirty cocaine" in live performances to highlight the anti-drug message of the song.  In addition, Clapton donated much of their funds to Crossroads Centre, a center that helps drug addicts kick their habit and rehabilitate themselves.

Deluxe Edition
In November 2012, a remastered two-compact-disc 35th anniversary deluxe edition of Slowhand was released. The first disc consists of the remastered album with additional bonus tracks, outtakes and studio jam sessions. The second disc features a previously unreleased live concert, recorded in April 1977 at the Hammersmith Odeon; although the concert is of the same era as the Slowhand sessions, it was performed prior to the album's recording and release, and so does not include any of the album's tracks.

Track listings

2012 Deluxe edition

35th Anniversary Super Deluxe Edition (27 Bonustracks – 1 LP, 3 CD, 1 DVD, 2012, GB) 
 Looking At The Train (Gordon Lightfoot) 3:39 Cover
 Alberta (Trad.) 2:40
 Greyhound Bus 2:57
 Stars, Strays And Ashtrays (Eric Clapton) 4:36
 Tell The Truth 9:00 Live
 Knocking On Heaven's Door (Bob Dylan) 5:18 Live Cover
 Steady Rolling Man (Robert Johnson) 6:55 Live
 Can’t Find My Way Home (Steve Winwood) 6:06 Live Cover
 Further On Up The Road (Joe Medwich Veasey, Don D. Robey) 6:35 Live
 Stormy Monday 12:42 Live
 Badge (George Harrison, Eric Clapton) 8:02 Live
 I Shot The Sheriff (Bob Marley) 14:04 Live Cover
 Layla (Eric Clapton, Jim Gordon) 6:02 Live Cover
 Badge (George Harrison, Eric Clapton) 8:36 Live
 Nobody Knows You When You’re Down And Out 4:00 Live
 I Shot The Sheriff (Bob Marley) 14:03 Live Cover
 Layla (Eric Clapton, Jim Gordon) 6:02 Live
 Key To The Highway (William Broonzy, Charles Seger) 7:25 Live Cover

DVD 
Cocaine (J.J. Cale) Cover
Wonderful Tonight (Eric Clapton)
Lay Down Sally (Eric Clapton, Marcy Levy)
Next Time You See Her (Eric Clapton)
We're All The Way (Don Williams)
The Core (Marcella Detroit, Eric Clapton)
May You Never (John Martyn) Cover
Mean Old Frisco (Arthur Crudup)
Peaches And Diesel (Albhy Galuten, Eric Clapton)

Personnel 
 Eric Clapton – lead vocals, guitars
 Dick Sims – keyboards
 George Terry – guitars
 Carl Radle – bass 
 Jamie Oldaker – drums, percussion
 Mel Collins – saxophones
 Yvonne Elliman – harmony and backing vocals
 Marcy Levy – harmony and backing vocals, duet on "The Core"

Production 
 Glyn Johns – producer, engineer
 El & Nell Ink. (David Stewart, Nello) – art direction and design
 Jonathan Dent – artwork
 Andy Seymour – inner sleeve photography 
 Watal Asanuma – outer sleeve photography

Charts

Certifications

References

Eric Clapton albums
1977 albums
Albums produced by Glyn Johns
RSO Records albums
Albums recorded at the Hammersmith Apollo
Albums recorded at Olympic Sound Studios